Doll Reader was a collectors magazine in the United States, appearing eight times a year. It included information on antique dolls, collectible and modern dolls and offerings from manufacturers and contemporary doll artists.

History and profile
Doll Reader began publication in 1972. Madavor Media, LLC, in Quincy, Massachusetts, was the publisher. Since October 2010 had included Haute Doll content into its publication. Haute Doll was a fashion doll collector's magazine that ended circulation in 2010.

Doll Reader merged with DOLL in 2012.

References

External links
 

Eight times annually magazines published in the United States
Defunct magazines published in the United States
Dolls
Hobby magazines published in the United States
Magazines established in 1972
Magazines disestablished in 2012
Magazines published in Massachusetts
1972 establishments in Massachusetts
2012 disestablishments in the United States